Pinho ( — pine in the Portuguese language) is a Portuguese surname. Notable people with the surname include:

Carlos João Pinho Coelho (born 1953), former Portuguese footballer
António Avelar de Pinho (born 1947), Portuguese singer and songwriter from Entroncamento
António Pinho (born 1899), Portuguese footballer
Caetano Pinho, former Indian footballer, coach, manager of ONGC F.C.
Cláudio Christovam de Pinho, the biggest scorer of all time for Corinthians
João Pinho (born 1992), Portuguese footballer
Manuel Pinho (born 1954), Portuguese economist and a former Minister of Economy with no political affiliation
Stefano Pinho (born 1991), Brazilian professional soccer player
Tony da Costa Pinho (born 1983), Brazilian footballer
Ana de Pinho Rodrigues or Ana Rodrigues (born 1994), Portuguese swimmer
Ricardo Andre de Pinho Sousa or Ricardo Sousa (born 1979), Portuguese retired footballer
Robert de Pinho de Souza (born 1981), association footballer
António Pinho Vargas (born 1951), Portuguese composer and pianist (Jazz and contemporary music)

See also
Uma flor de verde pinho ("A green-pine flower"), Portuguese entry in the Eurovision Song Contest 1976
Campinho (disambiguation)
Espinho (disambiguation)
Pincho
Pinhoe
Pinhou
Pinhão (disambiguation)
Pino (disambiguation)

Portuguese-language surnames